90 in November is the debut full-length album from American indie rock band Why Bonnie.

Track listing

References

2022 debut albums
Indie rock albums by American artists